Maria Bueno and Althea Gibson were the defending champions, but Gibson was ineligible to compete after turning professional. Bueno partnered with Janet Hopps but lost in the first round to Beverly Fleitz and Christine Truman.

Jeanne Arth and Darlene Hard defeated Fleitz and Truman in the final, 2–6, 6–2, 6–3 to win the ladies' doubles tennis title at the 1959 Wimbledon Championships.

Seeds

  Jeanne Arth /  Darlene Hard (champions)
  Yola Ramírez /  Rosie Reyes (semifinals)
  Beverly Fleitz /  Christine Truman (final)
  Sandra Reynolds /  Renée Schuurman (semifinals)

Draw

Finals

Top half

Section 1

Section 2

Bottom half

Section 3

Section 4

References

External links

Women's Doubles
Wimbledon Championship by year – Women's doubles
Wimbledon Championships
Wimbledon Championships